São Borja is a city in the Brazilian state of Rio Grande do Sul.  São Borja is the oldest municipality in the Brazilian state of Rio Grande do Sul and was founded in 1682 by the Jesuits as the first of the Seven Points of the Missions, and named São Francisco de Borja, in honor of Saint Francis Borgia.

Proximity with Argentina

It is situated on the Western Frontier of Rio Grande do Sul on the border with Argentina which is defined by the Uruguay River (Portuguese spelling of the river: Uruguai).

Served also by São Borja Airport, the city is linked to the Argentinian city of Santo Tomé through the Integration Bridge.

Presidential heritage

São Borja is known as the Land of the Presidents as is the birthplace of two Brazilian Presidents: Getúlio Vargas (1882–1954) and João Goulart (1919–1976).

See also

 Rio Grande do Sul#Geography
 Saint Francis Borgia

References

Capitals of former nations
Argentina–Brazil border crossings
Populated places established in 1682
Municipalities in Rio Grande do Sul